Greya obscura is a moth of the family Prodoxidae. It is found from south-western Oregon to the San Garbriel Mountains and the southern Sierra Nevada of California. The habitat consists of grassy portions of open oak woodland.

The wingspan is 10.5–19 mm. The forewings are grey to light brown in males and dark stramineous or with a slight bronzy iridescence in females. The hindwings are either the same shade as the forewings or darker but always without a pattern.

The larvae feed on Lithophragma species. The larvae are thought to be leaf miners.

References

Moths described in 1992
Prodoxidae
Taxa named by Donald R. Davis (entomologist)